Rio Grand was an American Texas Country group founded by Lance Leslie (harmonica, vocals), Tommy Rennick (vocals, bass guitar), Danny Rivera (lead vocals, guitar, banjo, lap steel guitar, Dobro, and Fred Stallcup (lead guitar, vocals). All four members were natives of the state of Texas. In addition, Tommy Rennick was previously a member of 37 South and the Allison Paige band. Fred Stallcup was previously a member of Lucious Funk. Lance Leslie was formerly in South 65.

In 2006, the group was signed to Asylum-Curb Records. Shortly afterward, their first single (titled "Kill Me Now") was released to radio, reaching a peak of 42 on the Billboard Hot Country Songs charts. Co-written by John Rich, Vicky McGehee and Anthony L. Smith, it received a positive rating from Deborah Evans Price of Billboard, who called it "promising". The band released an album, Painted Pony, in 2010.

Stallcup and Rivera found a second band in 2012 called Sweetwater Rain, which was also signed with Curb.

Discography

Extended plays

Singles

References

External links
Official Website

Country music groups from Texas
Curb Records artists
Musical groups established in 2006
Musical groups disestablished in 2012
2006 establishments in Texas